Judith Margaret Loe (born 6 March 1947) is an English actress. She was married to actor Richard Beckinsale until his death in 1979, and later married director Roy Battersby. She is the mother of actress Kate Beckinsale, and the stepmother of Kate's half-sister, Samantha.

Early life 
Loe was born in Urmston, Lancashire, the daughter of Norman Scarborough Loe, who worked in equipment business, and a mother Nancy (née Jones) who was a department store worker and model. She attended Urmston Grammar School and the University of Birmingham, where she graduated with a BA degree in English and Drama.

Television 
Loe was in the original British cast of the rock musical Hair. In 1970 she made her debut on British television and her first role was in the ITV Thames Television programme Ace of Wands broadcast 1970–72 as Lillian 'Lillu' Palmer. Following this, Loe made guest appearances on other series such as Z-Cars, Dixon of Dock Green, Man at the Top, Armchair Theatre and ITV Playhouse.

In 1973, Loe was cast in the role of Alice Lee in a short-lived BBC Television programme Woodstock, which only lasted for a single five-episode series. The same year she had a daughter, who became actress Kate Beckinsale. In 1975 Loe appeared in the role of Princess May in the ATV drama series Edward the Seventh (1975). Loe began making guest appearances in comedies such as Ripping Yarns, Robin's Nest, The Upchat Line and Miss Jones and Son. In 1978, Loe appeared in an episode of the television drama Crown Court shortly before landing the role of Dr Helen Sanders in the final two series of the television drama General Hospital playing the role from 1978 until 1979.

In 1980, Loe appeared in one episode each of Heartland and The Gentle Touch before appearing in two episodes of Sunday Night Thriller and three episodes of When the Boat Comes In (1981). She starred alongside Donald Churchill in the ITV sitcom Goodnight and God Bless. She also made a brief appearance as a nurse in Monty Python's The Meaning of Life (1983). In 1984, Loe starred as the abandoned house wife Allison in a six-part BBC1 serial called Missing from Home by Roger Marshall and directed by Douglas Camfield. Loe continued to make guest appearances in drama programmes up to 1985 shortly before landing the role of Diane in the television programme Yesterday's Dreams in 1987. In 1988, Loe gained the role of Pamela in the Yorkshire Television sitcom Singles with Roger Rees; this was the first sitcom which Loe had ever starred in and this lasted three series until 1991. In 1990, she took a regular role in The Chief, playing Dr Elizabeth Stafford from 1990 to 1993.

In 1997, she played Adele Cecil in Death Is Now My Neighbour, an episode of Inspector Morse, reprising her role the following year in The Wench is Dead.

In 1998 she played Commander Kathryn MacTiernan in Space Island One.

Between 2001 and 2002, she played Jan Goddard in Casualty and its spin off Holby City from 2002 to 2003. In 2009 Loe appeared in the medical drama Doctors.

Personal life 
Judy Loe has been married twice: first to Richard Beckinsale, from 1977 until his death in 1979. She married TV director Roy Battersby on 6 March 1997, which was her 50th birthday.

Television roles

References

External links

1947 births
Living people
Alumni of the University of Birmingham
English television actresses
People from Urmston
People educated at Urmston Grammar